This is a list of tennis players who have represented the Czech Republic Davis Cup team in an official Davis Cup match. The team is considered a direct successor of the Czechoslovakian side, which competed from 1921 to 1992, therefore share their historical record. They started playing as the Czech Republic in 1993.

Czech Republic players

Czechoslovakia players

Notes

References

Lists of Davis Cup tennis players
Davis Cup